John Kirkham (16 June 1918 – 1982) was an English professional footballer who played as a centre forward for Ellesmere Port Town, Wolverhampton Wanderers, Bournemouth & Boscombe Athletic and Wellington Town.

References

1918 births
1982 deaths
English footballers
Ellesmere Port Town F.C. players
Wolverhampton Wanderers F.C. players
AFC Bournemouth players
Telford United F.C. players
English Football League players
Association football forwards